Jamille Boatswain (born 30 September 1993) is a Trinidian footballer who plays as a striker for Honduran side Honduras Progreso and the Trinidad and Tobago national team.

International career
Boatswain made his international debut on 10 March 2017 in a friendly against Barbados. After coming on as a 33rd-minute substitute, he scored twice before being subbed off himself in the 62nd minute. According to FIFA rules, because he came on as a substitute but did not finish the match he was not credited with a cap. Therefore, after the match his international statistics were officially two goals in zero caps.

International goals
Scores and results list Trinidad and Tobago's goal tally first.

References

External links
 
 

1993 births
Living people
Trinidad and Tobago footballers
Trinidad and Tobago international footballers
Association football midfielders
Point Fortin Civic F.C. players
Defence Force F.C. players
C.D. Honduras Progreso players
Liga Nacional de Fútbol Profesional de Honduras players
Trinidad and Tobago expatriate footballers
Trinidad and Tobago expatriate sportspeople in Honduras
Expatriate footballers in Honduras